Lliçà may refer to two municipalities in Catalonia, Spain in the province of Barcelona in the comarca of Vallès Oriental:
Lliçà d'Amunt
Lliçà de Vall

See also
Llica, small town in Bolivia